Kardegar Mahalleh (also Romanized as Kārdegar Maḩalleh; also known as Kārd Gar Maḩalleh) is a village in Emamzadeh Abdollah Rural District, Dehferi District, Fereydunkenar County, Mazandaran Province, Iran. At the 2006 census, its population was 2,145, in 555 families.

References 

Populated places in Fereydunkenar County